Who Wants to Sleep? is a 1965 Austrian-West German comedy film directed by Rolf Thiele, Axel von Ambesser and Alfred Weidenmann and starring Curd Jürgens, Anita Ekberg, and Catherine Deneuve. It consists of a series of episodic tales about the relationships of the characters.

It was shot at the Sievering Studios in Vienna. The film's sets were designed by the art director Herta Hareiter.

Cast

References

Bibliography

External links

1965 comedy films
Austrian comedy films
German comedy films
West German films
German anthology films
Films directed by Rolf Thiele
Films shot at Sievering Studios
Constantin Film films
1960s German-language films
1960s German films